For Liouville's equation in dynamical systems, see Liouville's theorem (Hamiltonian).
 For Liouville's equation in quantum mechanics, see Von Neumann equation.
 For Liouville's equation in Euclidean space, see Liouville–Bratu–Gelfand equation.

In differential geometry, Liouville's equation, named after Joseph Liouville, is the nonlinear partial differential equation satisfied by the conformal factor  of a metric  on a surface of constant Gaussian curvature :

where  is the flat Laplace operator

Liouville's equation appears in the study of isothermal coordinates in differential geometry: the independent variables  are the coordinates, while  can be described as the conformal factor with respect to the flat metric. Occasionally it is the square  that is referred to as the conformal factor, instead of  itself.

Liouville's equation was also taken as an example by David Hilbert in the formulation of his nineteenth problem.

Other common forms of Liouville's equation
By using the change of variables , another commonly found form of Liouville's equation is obtained:

Other two forms of the equation, commonly found in the literature, are obtained by using the slight variant  of the previous change of variables and Wirtinger calculus: 

Note that it is exactly in the first one of the preceding two forms that Liouville's equation was cited by David Hilbert in the formulation of his nineteenth problem.

A formulation using the Laplace–Beltrami operator
In a more invariant fashion, the equation can be written in terms of the intrinsic Laplace–Beltrami operator

 

as follows:

Properties

Relation to Gauss–Codazzi equations

General solution of the equation
In a simply connected domain , the general solution of Liouville's equation can be found by using Wirtinger calculus. Its form is given by

where  is any meromorphic function such that
  for every .

Application
Liouville's equation can be used to prove the following classification results for surfaces:

. A surface in the Euclidean 3-space with metric , and with constant scalar curvature  is locally isometric to:
 the sphere if ;
 the Euclidean plane if ;
 the Lobachevskian plane if .

See also
 Liouville field theory, a two-dimensional conformal field theory whose classical equation of motion is a generalization of Liouville's equation

Notes

Citations

Works cited

.
.

Differential equations
Differential geometry